The 2014 Evolution Championship Series (commonly referred to as Evo 2014 or EVO 2014) was a fighting game event held in at Westgate Las Vegas on July 11–13. The event featured a major tournament for eight fighting games, including Ultra Street Fighter IV and BlazBlue: Chrono Phantasma. The event was part of the first Capcom Pro Tour.

Background

Evo 2014 was announced in September 2013 and was slated to feature primarily Xbox 360 versions of fighting games. As the first Capcom Pro Tour was announced in March 2014, Evo was scheduled to be one of its ten first "Premier Events". Capcom announced a month later that the company would provide a bonus $10,000 USD to the prize pool of Evo's Ultra Street Fighter IV tournament. Nintendo also sponsored the event, which was noted as a surprising shift in policy after the company tried to shut down the Super Smash Bros. portion of the event in 2013.

All of the tournaments held at Evo 2014 were livestreamed and available for free on the Twitch online video service. Evo 2014 broke the record for the largest Super Smash Bros. Melee competition up to that point, with 970 entrants. The Ultra Street Fighter IV tournament also broke its record, with nearly 2,000 players competing for the title. The event, held at the Westgate Las Vegas Resort & Casino on July 11–13, had a total prize pool of US$100,000 and was described by IGN as "the 'World Cup' of competitive fighting games."

Games
Eight major tournaments were held at Evo 2014. The games played were:
Ultra Street Fighter IV
Ultimate Marvel vs. Capcom 3
Super Smash Bros. Melee
BlazBlue: Chrono Phantasma
Killer Instinct
Injustice: Gods Among Us
King of Fighters XIII
Tekken Tag 2

2014 was the first year to feature Killer Instinct as a main title at the Evolution Championship Series. The 2013 Xbox One release of the game was well received by both critics and the fighting game community. Injustice: Gods Among Us failed to impress audiences at Evo 2013, and Ozzie Mejia of Shack News suggested that, if the game were to disappoint again, it was likely it wouldn't return in 2015.

Reveals
Bandai Namco revealed the first trailer for Tekken 7 at Evo 2014. NetherRealm Studios announced that the character Raiden would return in Mortal Kombat X, which was to be released the following year. Meanwhile Microsoft announced that Maya would be the next character to be added to Killer Instinct. Nintendo showed a video of Reggie Fils-Aimé thanking the fighting game community for their dedication to the Super Smash Bros. series during the Melee finals.

Tournament summary

The Ultra Street Fighter IV tournament was won by Olivier "Luffy" Hay, playing on a PlayStation gamepad rather than a more traditional arcade controller. Luffy, playing as the character Rose won against Japanese player Bonchan in the finale. Daigo Umehara finished outside of the Top 8 at Evo 2014 for the first time in the tournament's history.

Playing as the character Litchi, Japanese player Garireo won the BlazBlue: Chrono Phantasma tournament. Coming out of the loser's bracket, Garireo's final match against Dogura's Azrael was considered highly impressive by journalist. Mike Fahey of Kotaku described his 3-to-2 win as "the most intense battle Of EVO 2014" up to that point, and Earnest Cavalli of Engadget called it the "most thrilling competitive drama" of the weekend. Garireo won over US$23,000 at the tournament.

The Ultimate Marvel vs. Capcom tournament was won by Justin Wong after making a high-tension comeback against Filipino Champ in the winners finals, and would go on to defeat Chris G in the grand finals. Meanwhile, the Super Smash Bros. Melee tournament was won by Mango, who defeated Hungrybox in the finale and won US$5,820.

Results

References

Evolution Championship Series
2014 in sports in Nevada
Westgate Las Vegas